The Reinactors is a 2008 documentary film directed by Dave Markey about the lives of film character impersonators and celebrity look-a-likes on the Hollywood Walk Of Fame. The film was well received by critics and audiences during its world premiere at the 2008 Rotterdam Film Festival, going on to screen around the world at various film festivals. The documentary also aired on Canada's Super Channel in September and October 2009. The DVD was released in the United States September 2009 by We Got Power Films. Filmmaker Spike Jonze is cited in the film's marketing calling it "A strange and tragic portrait of a dream that lives on one square block in Hollywood, and kind of in our whole country, too."

Overview 

The film records the lives of film character impersonators and celebrity look-a-likes on Hollywood Boulevard over the span of a year. Elvis, Freddy Krueger works alongside Superman, Marilyn Monroe, Shrek, Batman, Borat, and Minnie Mouse as competing Chewbaccas, Spidermen and Captain Jack Sparrows vie for a spot on the limited real estate of Hollywood Boulevard's Walk Of Fame. The street characters featured have dreams of breaking into the big-time but the realities of the situation soon catch up with them.

Cast 
Johnny Elvis Foster
Gerard Christian Zacher	 
Christopher Dennis
Michael A. Luce	
Tienna Marie Johns
Maxwell Allen
Melissa Weiss
Adam Allee
Mitchell Schonberner
Juan R. Simmons
Sandra Lee Allen
Thomas Parsons
Damon Knight
Omar Budhoo
Fred Young
Sean Vezina
Marty Porter
Tuck John Porter
Drevon Cooks
Tony Tomey
Bonnie Finkenthal Dennis
Matthew Muhl
David Billingsley
Henry Avalos
Kevin Barner
David Born
Gary A. Downe
Gil Gex
Arlene Parness
Neil Moryson
Thomas Rocheblaue
Johnny Elvis Foster
Ray Manzarek
Directed by David J. Markey
Produced by Kevin Church & David J. Markey
Cinematography by David J. Markey,   	 	
Film Editing by Antony Berrios,   	 	
Original Music by Devo, Lee Ranaldo, Abby Travis, & Curt Kirkwood
On-line editor: Mark Fletcher
Additional Editor: Tanner Roth	
Assistant Editor: Samantha Deghetto
Assistant Director: Dan Clark	
Field Recordist: Kunal Rajan		
Supervising Sound Editor: Nathan Russell	
Sound Editor: Israel Segura

External links

The Reinactors official with Trailer & Photos
The Reinactors MySpace
We Got Power Films
Ahipictures

2008 films
Documentary films about entertainers
American documentary films
Documentary films about Hollywood, Los Angeles
2000s English-language films
2000s American films